Saint-Clément-des-Baleines is a commune on Île de Ré, a coastal island in the French department of Charente-Maritime, located in the region of Nouvelle-Aquitaine (formerly Poitou-Charentes).

Population

Geography
This commune has no harbor. Five villages are aggregated in: Le Gillieux, Le Chabot, La Tricherie, Le Griveau, Le Godinand. It was named according to mass whale strandings happened on the sandbank at the northwestern side of the island during their migrations.
The Phare des Baleines is located on the western tip of Île de Ré.

See also
Communes of the Charente-Maritime department

References

Communes of Charente-Maritime
Île de Ré
Charente-Maritime communes articles needing translation from French Wikipedia
Populated coastal places in France